Jasen Lee Fisher (born May 8, 1980) is an American former child actor.

Career
Fisher made his first film appearance in Parenthood (1989) as Kevin Buckman alongside Steve Martin and Rick Moranis, receiving a nomination for a Young Artist Award as a supporting actor. He portrayed the main character of Luke in The Witches (1990) alongside Rowan Atkinson and Anjelica Huston, for which he was nominated for the Saturn Award for Best Performance by a Younger Actor.

At the age of 11, he portrayed Ace (one of the Lost Boys) in the film Hook (1991) alongside Robin Williams and Julia Roberts, for which the cast received the 'Outstanding young ensemble cast in a motion picture' award at the 1991–92 Youth in Film Awards.He has had no further screen credits since.

Personal life
Fisher attended William Fremd High School in Palatine, Illinois, graduating in the Class of 1998.

Filmography

References

External links

American male child actors
American male film actors
Living people
1980 births